Nepenthes gymnamphora  is a tropical pitcher plant native to the Indonesian islands of Java and Sumatra. There is much debate surrounding the taxonomic status of this species and the taxa N. pectinata and N. xiphioides.

The specific epithet gymnamphora is derived from the Greek words gymnos (naked) and amphoreus (pitcher).

Taxonomy

The N. gymnamphora group of related taxa has been variously interpreted as comprising a single extremely variable species (N. gymnamphora); two distinct species, one from Java (N. gymnamphora) and one from Sumatra (N. pectinata); or two species, one with a wide distribution covering Java and Sumatra (N. gymnamphora) and one with a very restricted range in Sumatra (N. xiphioides). An additional fourth undescribed taxon, known from Mount Sorik Merapi in Sumatra, may also fall within N. gymnamphora.

Nepenthes pectinata
Nepenthes pectinata was described by B. H. Danser in his seminal 1928 monograph "The Nepenthaceae of the Netherlands Indies". Danser's description of N. pectinata was based on material that included upper pitchers of N. singalana. This was first noted in 1994 by Jan Schlauer and Joachim Nerz, who provided a lectotype for N. pectinata: Bünnemeijer 700, a specimen collected on Mount Talakmau.

Danser mentioned another specimen in his monograph that he identified as the natural hybrid N. pectinata × N. singalana, but which actually represented a pure N. singalana.

Nepenthes pectinata has a separate conservation status of Least Concern on the IUCN Red List.

Nepenthes xiphioides
Nepenthes xiphioides was described by Bruce Salmon and Ricky Maulder in a 1995 issue of the Carnivorous Plant Newsletter. The authors treated N. pectinata as conspecific with N. gymnamphora, and distinguished N. xiphioides from the latter based on a number of characters shown in the table below.

Infraspecific taxa

Nepenthes gymnamphora var. haematamphora Miq. (1851)
Nepenthes gymnamphora var. pectinata (Danser) Hort.Westphal (1999) in sched.

Natural hybrids
N. bongso × N. gymnamphora
N. gymnamphora × N. mikei [=N. × pangulubauensis]
N. gymnamphora × N. ovata
N. gymnamphora × N. reinwardtiana
? N. gymnamphora × N. rhombicaulis
N. gymnamphora × N. singalana
N. gymnamphora × N. spathulata
N. gymnamphora × N. spectabilis
N. gymnamphora × N. talangensis

Notes

a.Nepenthes pectinata is pronounced . The specific epithet is derived from the Latin word pectinata, meaning "comb-shaped".
b.Nepenthes xiphioides is pronounced . The specific epithet is derived from the New Latin word xiphius (sword) and the Latin ending -oides (resembling), and refers to the long, thin teeth lining the inner margin of the peristome of this species.

References

Further reading

 Adam, J.H., C.C. Wilcock & M.D. Swaine 1992.  Journal of Tropical Forest Science 5(1): 13–25.
 Bauer, U., C.J. Clemente, T. Renner & W. Federle 2012. Form follows function: morphological diversification and alternative trapping strategies in carnivorous Nepenthes pitcher plants. Journal of Evolutionary Biology 25(1): 90–102. 
 Clarke, C.M., R. Cantley, J. Nerz, H. Rischer & A. Witsuba 2000. Nepenthes gymnamphora. 2006 IUCN Red List of Threatened Species. IUCN 2006. Retrieved on 10 May 2006.
 Clarke, C.M. 2006. Introduction. In: Danser, B.H. The Nepenthaceae of the Netherlands Indies. Natural History Publications (Borneo), Kota Kinabalu. pp. 1–15.
 Hakim, L., A.Y. Wartono, J. Batoro & N. Nakagoshi 2006. Nepenthes gymnamphora Nees in East Java, Indonesia: Recent distribution status and new locality from Mt. Semeru. Hikobia 14(4): 493–497.
  Handayani, T. 1999.  [Conservation of Nepenthes in Indonesian botanic gardens.] In: A. Mardiastuti, I. Sudirman, K.G. Wiryawan, L.I. Sudirman, M.P. Tampubolon, R. Megia & Y. Lestari (eds.) Prosiding II: Seminar Hasil-Hasil Penelitian Bidang Ilmu Hayat. Pusat Antar Universitas Ilmu Hayat IPB, Bogor. pp. 365–372.
 Hernawati & P. Akhriadi 2006. A Field Guide to the Nepenthes of Sumatra. PILI-NGO Movement, Bogor.
 Jebb, M. 1994. NEPENTHES revision for Flora Malesiana. Carnivorous Plant Mailing List, September 9, 1994.
 Kitching, R.L. 2000. Food Webs and Container Habitats: The natural history and ecology of phytotelmata. Cambridge University Press, Cambridge.
 Korthals, P.W. 1839. Over het geslacht Nepenthes. In: C.J. Temminck 1839–1842. Verhandelingen over de Natuurlijke Geschiedenis der Nederlandsche overzeesche bezittingen; Kruidkunde. Leiden. pp. 1–44, t. 1–4, 13–15, 20–22.
 Kurata, S. 1973. Nepenthes from Borneo, Singapore and Sumatra. The Gardens' Bulletin Singapore 26(2): 227–232.
  Mansur, M. 2001.  In: Prosiding Seminar Hari Cinta Puspa dan Satwa Nasional. Lembaga Ilmu Pengetahuan Indonesia, Bogor. pp. 244–253.
 Meimberg, H., A. Wistuba, P. Dittrich & G. Heubl 2001. Molecular phylogeny of Nepenthaceae based on cladistic analysis of plastid trnK intron sequence data. Plant Biology 3(2): 164–175. 
  Meimberg, H. 2002.  Ph.D. thesis, Ludwig Maximilian University of Munich, Munich.
 Meimberg, H. & G. Heubl 2006. Introduction of a nuclear marker for phylogenetic analysis of Nepenthaceae. Plant Biology 8(6): 831–840. 
 Meimberg, H., S. Thalhammer, A. Brachmann & G. Heubl 2006. Comparative analysis of a translocated copy of the trnK intron in carnivorous family Nepenthaceae. Molecular Phylogenetics and Evolution 39(2): 478–490. 
 Menzel, R. 1922. Beiträge zur Kenntnis der Mikrofauna von Niederländisch Ost-Indien. II. Über den tierischen Inhalt der Kannen von Nepenthes melamphora Reinw. mit besonderer berücksichtigung der Nematoden. Treubia 3: 116–122.
 Micoletzky, H. & R. Menzel 1928. Beiträge zur Kenntnis der Mikrofauna von Niederländisch Ost-Indien. VII. Anguillula nepenthicola Menzel aus kannen von Nepenthes gymnaphora Nees bei Tjibodas. Treubia 10: 285–290.
  Mulyanto, H., D. Cahyuningdari & A.D. Setyawan 2000. Kantung semar (Nepenthes sp.) di lereng Gunung Merbabu. [Insectivore plants Nepenthes sp. at Mount Merbabu.] Biodiversitas 1(2): 54–58.  Cover 
 van Oye, P. 1921. Zur Biologie der Kanne von Nepenthes melamphora Reinw.. Biologisches Zentralblatt 41: 529–534.
  Puspitaningtyas, D.M. & H. Wawangningrum 2007. Keanekaragaman Nepenthes di Suaka Alam Sulasih Talang - Sumatera Barat. [Nepenthes diversity in Sulasih Talang Nature Reserve - West Sumatra.] Biodiversitas 8(2): 152–156.  Cover 
 Renner, T. & C.D. Specht 2011. A sticky situation: assessing adaptations for plant carnivory in the Caryophyllales by means of stochastic character mapping. International Journal of Plant Sciences 172(7): 889–901. 
 Schlauer, J. 1995. Re: N.xiphioides + N.mikei. Carnivorous Plant Mailing List, September 26, 1995.
 Shivas, R.G. 1984.  Carnivorous Plant Newsletter 13(1): 10–15.
  Syamsuardi & R. Tamin 1994. Kajian kekerabatan jenis-jenis Nepenthes di Sumatera Barat. Project report, Andalas University, Padang. Abstract  
  Syamsuardi 1995. Klasifikasi numerik kantong semar (Nepenthes) di Sumatera Barat. [Numerical classification of pitcher plants (Nepenthes) in West Sumatra.] Journal Matematika dan Pengetahuan Alam 4(1): 48–57. Abstract  
 Whitten, T., S.J. Damanik, J. Anwar & N. Hisyam 2000. The Ecology of Sumatra. Periplus Editions, Hong Kong.
  Yogiara 2004.  M.Sc. thesis, Bogor Agricultural University, Bogor.
 Yogiara, A. Suwanto & M.T. Suhartono 2006. A complex bacterial community living in pitcher plant fluid. Jurnal Mikrobiologi Indonesia 11(1): 9–14.

External links

 Photographs of N. gymnamphora at the Carnivorous Plant Photofinder
 Documentary film about N. gymnamphora

Carnivorous plants of Asia
gymnamphora
Plants described in 1824
Least concern plants